, there were 6,740 electric vehicles in Missouri, equivalent to 0.12% of all vehicles in the state.

Government policy
, the state government charges a $90 registration fee for electric vehicles. This fee is scheduled to increase by 20% per year until 2026.

Charging stations
, there were 985 charging stations in Missouri.

The Infrastructure Investment and Jobs Act, signed into law in November 2021, allocates  to charging stations in Missouri.

By region

Columbia
, there were 18 electric vehicles registered in Columbia.
, there were 25 charging stations in the city.

Jefferson City
, there were 75 electric vehicles registered in Cole County.

, there were 9 charging station locations in Cole County.

Kansas City

St. Louis
, St. Louis and St. Louis County have passed ordinances requiring a certain percentage of new parking spaces constructed to have electric vehicle charging infrastructure installed.

References

Missouri
Road transportation in Missouri